Kosmos 1300 also known as Tselina-D #30 is an electronic signals intelligence satellite launched by the Soviet Union on 8 August 1981 from Plesetsk Cosmodrome Site 32/1 on a Tsyklon-3 rocket.

It is estimated to weigh two tons and have a lifetime of two months. It has been space debris since it stopped functioning.

Potential collision

On 18 September 2019 at 8:05:55 UTC it was projected to have a 5.6% chance of colliding with the Genesis II commercial space debris at a velocity of 14.6 km/s. The collision would take place over Awasa, Ethiopia. Bigelow Aerospace, the company that made Genesis II, reported afterward that the US Air Force had notified them that there was no collision.

References

Kosmos satellites
Spacecraft launched in 1981
1981 in the Soviet Union
Reconnaissance satellites of the Soviet Union
Derelict satellites orbiting Earth